Denmark–South Africa relations refers to the bilateral relations between Denmark and South Africa. Denmark has an embassy in Pretoria and South Africa has an embassy in Copenhagen.

Queen Margrethe II visited to South Africa in 1996. President Nelson Mandela visited Denmark in 1999. Denmark has always had a very active development co-operation programme with South Africa dating from the 1960s, which was changed to an assistance programme from 1995. Denmark assisted with 4 billion DKK. Denmark remains a strong supporter of NEPAD.

Cultural relations between South Africa and Denmark are established in, among other forums, the Danish Society in South Africa and the Nordic-South African Business Association.

See also 
 Foreign relations of Denmark
 Foreign relations of South Africa

References

External links
 Urban Environmental Management Programme (UEMP)
 Partnership
 Ambassador's Greeting
 South Africa's Foreign Policy
 SA, Denmark sign wind energy deal
 Danes ready to support South Africa’s wind energy roll-out
 Danish Society in South Africa
 [www.nsba.co.za Nordic-South African Business Association]

 
South Africa
Bilateral relations of South Africa